The Ottilien Congregation, often also known as the St. Ottilien Congregation and as the Missionary Benedictines, is a congregation of religious houses within the Benedictine Confederation, the aim of which is to combine the Benedictine way of life with activity in the mission field.

History

The congregation was founded in 1884, incorporating the houses founded on the vision of Andreas Amrhein, a monk of Beuron Archabbey, who, finding it impossible to realise the vision of the Benedictine mission within Beuron, left to begin an independent community. He set up a house in 1884 at Reichenbach in the Oberpfalz, but the site was too remote, and in 1887 the community moved to what is now St. Ottilien Archabbey in Oberbayern.

In the same year the first missionary monks left for the Apostolic Prefecture of South Zanzibar in German East Africa, a territory which now comprises several dioceses in Tanzania, which the monks serve from the abbeys of Peramiho, Ndanda and Hanga and several smaller houses. Similarly the Congregation's Zululand mission (begun in 1921) is now an independent monastery serving the diocese it once helped to create.

In 1908 an Asian mission field was added, comprising two abbeys in North Korea and China, which after the end of World War II were re-constituted as Waegwan Abbey in South Korea. There is also a priory at Digos on Mindanao Island in the Philippines.

Further monasteries were established in North and South America after World War I, and more recently several new foundations have been made in the Third World, mostly in Africa.

The Archabbot of St. Ottilien is ex officio president of the congregation.

Women religious have formed part of the Missionary Benedictine enterprise from the beginning, based at first at St. Ottilien but shortly after at their own house nearby. They have developed independently and today form the Congregation of Missionary Benedictine Sisters of Tutzing.

Demographics
As a Congregation founded with the purpose of evangelizing German East Africa, it is no great surprise that the vast majority of early monks were Germans. As the Church grew in Africa and Asia, the Missionary Benedictines eventually began to accept indigenous vocations. Though the Congregation's European houses currently possess the greatest number of solemnly professed monks, these will soon be outnumbered by the African monasteries.

As of March 17, 2015, the Benedictine Missionaries feature four houses with monastic populations in excess of one hundred monks:
 Hanga (143)
 Waegwan (122)
 St Ottilien (113)
 Münsterschwarzach (113)

List of member houses and dependencies

Europe

Germany:
Sacred Heart Archabbey, St Ottilien (1887)
Sacred Heart Priory, Jakobsberg
Monastery of the Holy Redeemer, Monte Irago, Spain
St Felicity's Abbey, Münsterschwarzach
St Benedict's Priory, Damme
Christ the King Priory, Schuyler, United States
Holy Trinity Abbey, Schweiklberg
Königsmünster Abbey, Meschede
St Benedict's Cella, Hanover
Austria:
St Joseph's Abbey, Fiecht
Switzerland:
St Otmar's Abbey, Uznach
Our Lady of the Plentiful Catch Monastery, Osornoe, Kazakhstan

Africa

Democratic Republic of the Congo
Monastery of St Odile, Malandji (suspended in 1996)
Kenya:
Prince of Peace Conventual Priory, Tigoni
St Benedict's Monastery, Nairobi
Our Lady Queen of the World Monastery, Nanyuki
Monastery of Peter the Fisherman, Illeret
St George Study House, Langata (Congregation)
St Benedict's Procure, Eldoret (Congregation)
South Africa:
Sacred Heart Abbey, Inkamana
St Boniface Monastery, Waldfrieden, Namibia
St Benedict's Study House, Cedara
Tanzania:
St Maurus and St Placidus Abbey, Hanga
St John Bosco Formation House, Nakagugu
St Teresia of Lisieux Priory, Katibunga, Zambia
St Joseph's Farm, Nole
St Placidus Procure, Dar-es-Salaam
St Bernard's Priory, Kipalapala
St Benedict's Monastery, Mbeya
St Benedict's Monastery, Pugu
Holy Spirit Abbey, Mvimwa
St Benedict's Monastery, Sumbawanga
St Bernard's Monastery, Kipili
Our Lady Help of Christians Abbey, Ndanda
St Maurus Procure, Kurasini
St Benedict Parish, Sakarani
St Benedict's Abbey, Peramiho
St Raphael's Priory, Uwemba
Togo:
Incarnation Conventual Priory, Agbang
St Maurus and St Placidus Monastery, Kara
Cella St Boniface, Lomé
Uganda:
Christ the King Priory, Tororo (Congregation)

Asia

China (People's Republic):
Holy Cross Abbey Yanji (suppressed in 1946)
Holy Cross Monastery, Kouqian
India:
St Michael's Priory, Kumily (Congregation)
Korea:
St Benedict's Territorial Abbey, Tokwon (1909-1949)
St Maurus and St Placidus Abbey, Waegwan
St Benedict's Monastery, Seoul
St Joseph's Monastery, Namyangju
St Benedict's Monastery, Busan
St John the Baptist Monastery, Daegu
St Benedict's Village for the Aged, Kumnam
St Paul's Abbey, Newton II
 St Benedict's Monastery, Hwasun
Philippines:
St Benedict's Conventual Priory, Digos
St Anselm's Study House, Davao
''St. Scholastica's Priory, Manila

America

Colombia:
St Benedict's Conventual Priory, El Rosal
Cuba:
Priory of the Epiphany of the Lord, Havana (Congregation)
United States:
St Paul's Abbey, Newton, New Jersey
Venezuela:
St Joseph's Abbey, Güigüe

References

External links
 Congregation of the Missionary Benedictines official website

Religious organizations established in 1884
Benedictine congregations
1884 establishments in Germany